Jasminum auriculatum is a species of jasmine, in the family Oleaceae. It is found in India, Nepal, Sri Lanka, Bhutan and the Andaman Islands.
Due to essential oil contained in the flowers, it cultivated commercially in India and Thailand. It is used for decorative purposes and festivals in India. It is commonly called "JUI"(ଯୁଇ, জুই) in India in Odia and Bengali languages. Jasminum Auriculatum is called Nityamalli in Tamil.

Etymology

'Jasminum' is a Latinized form of the Arabic word, 'yasemin' for sweetly scented plants.

References

auriculatum
Plants described in 1794
Flora of the Indian subcontinent
Taxa named by Martin Vahl